The Bakunins are a Russian noble family.

Origin
The Bakunin family claims descent from Stephen Báthory, the Prince of Transylvania who campaigned against Ivan the Terrible for control over Livonia. According to the family legend, the Bakunin dynasty was founded in 1492 by Zenislav Bakunin, one of the three brothers of the Báthory family who left Hungary to serve under Vasili III of Russia. Zenislav was subsequently baptised as Peter Bakunin and granted estates in Ryazan, where his family continued to serve the Russian Empire. But the first documented ancestor of the Bakunins was a 17th-century Moscow clerk Nikifor Evdokimov, who became a noble in 1677, going by the nickname of "Bakunin".

Family tree  

Mikhail Ivanovich Bakunin — commandant in Tsaritsyn under Peter the Great;
 (1700—1766) — Active State Councillor and official of the Collegium of Foreign Affairs under Elizabeth of Russia;
  (1724—1800) — official of the Collegium of Foreign Affairs, rose to the rank of Active State Councillor. From 1783 to 1785 he was the leader of the nobility in Luga district, married to Ekaterina Andreevna Barteneva, had three daughters: Anna, Alexandra and Maria.
  (1731—1786) — official of the Collegium of Foreign Affairs, under Nikita Panin, and Privy Councillor. 
  (1765—1802) — a well-known agronomist, headed the Tsarskoye Selo agricultural school. He held the rank of Privy Councillor. 
 Nikolai Modestovich Bakunin (1799—1838) —  (from April 1833). He was married to Baroness Sophia Karlovna von Tipolt.
 Modest Nikolaevich Bakunin — diplomat
  (1848—1913) — consul general in Sarajevo and Copenhagen.
 Stepanida Nikolaevich Bakunin
  (1801—1841) — major general in the Russo-Turkish War and the Caucasian War.
  (1776—1805) — director of the Russian Academy of Sciences and manager of the Russian Academy, later chamberlain and Active State Councillor. 
  (1797—1862) — governor of Tver and Privy Councillor. 
  (1828—1893) — active state councilor, chamberlain, founder of a glass factory.
 Semyon Pavlovich Bakunin (1802—1864)
  (1795—1869).
  (1730—1803) — Collegiate Councillor under Catherine the Great. Founder of the Bakunin family estate in Pryamukhino.
  (1764—1837) — Major General, Governor of Mogilev and St. Petersburg:
  (1795—1863) — major general and member of the Union of Prosperity.
 Ivan Mikhailovich Bakunin (1802—1874) — colonel.
 Lyubov Mikhailovna Bakunina (1801).
  (1793—1882) — an artist who received a gold medal from the Academy of Fine Arts.
  (1811—1894) — sister of mercy.
 Praksovya Mikhailovna Bakunina (1812—1882) — writer and poet.
 Ivan Mikhailovich Bakunin (1766—1796) — lieutenant colonel in the Persian expedition of 1796
 Aleksandr Mikhailovich Bakunin (1768—1854) — Tver landowner, poet and publicist. 
 Lyubov Aleksandrovna Bakunina (1811—1838) — the bride of Nikolai Stankevich;
 Varvara Alexandrovna Bakunina (1812—1866) 
 Mikhail Aleksandrovich Bakunin (1814—1876) — Russian thinker, revolutionary, anarchist, pan-Slavist, one of the ideologists of populism.
 Maria Mikhailovich Bakunina (1873—1960) — chemist and biologist
  (1815—1871) 
 Aleksandra Aleksandrovna Bakunina (1816—1882)
 Ilya Aleksandrovich Bakunin (1819—1900) — landowner
  (1874—1945) — doctor, deputy of the State Duma of the II convocation from the Tver province.
  (1904—1995) — professor at the University of Paris, historian of Freemasonry, wife of Mikhail Osorgin
  (1820—1900) — philosopher-publicist, public figure.
  (1821—1908) — defender of Sevastopol, participant in the battles for the unification of Italy, public figure.
  (1823—1882)— activist for agrarian reform, botanist.

References

Bibliography
 
 

1492 establishments in Europe
1677 establishments in Russia
Báthory family
Noble titles created in 1677
Russian noble families
Russian people of Hungarian descent